Muhammad I (823–886)  was the Umayyad emir of Córdoba from 852 to 886 in the Al-Andalus (Moorish Iberia).

Biography
Muhammad was born in Córdoba. His reign was marked by several revolts and separatist movements of the Muwallad (Muslims of ethnic Iberian origin) and Mozarabs (Christians living in the Muslim controlled areas).

The Banu Qasi Muwallad family, led by Musa ibn Musa, allied with the Arista family of the Kingdom of Navarre, and rebelled, proclaiming himself "third king of Spain" (after Muhammad and Ordoño I of Asturias). The rebel Umayyad officer Ibn Marwan returned to Mérida and also rebelled against the emir who, unable to quash the revolt, allowed him to found a free city (Badajoz, in what is now the Spanish region of Extremadura) in 875. Finally, Toledo rebelled with the support of Ordoño I, but was defeated in the battle of Guazalete.

He engaged in diplomacy with Charles the Bald, the Carolingian king of the West Franks, sending him camels in 865.

In 880 Umar ibn Hafsun, a man of probable Visigothic or African origin, also started a revolt which was only suppressed in 928, under Abd ar-Rahman III ibn Muhammad.

Muhammad I died in 886, being succeeded by his son al-Mundhir ibn Muhammad I.

Sources

 

823 births
886 deaths
Emirs of Córdoba
9th-century rulers in Europe
People from Córdoba, Spain

9th-century Arabs
City founders